Erika Elaine Sifrit (née Grace; born February 3, 1978) and Benjamin Adam "BJ" Sifrit (born October 21, 1977) are an American couple convicted of murdering two tourists, Joshua Edward Ford and Martha Margene "Geney" Crutchley, in Ocean City, Maryland, in 2002. The case drew substantial media attention. In 2003, both Sifrits were convicted of the murders.

Benjamin Sifrit is currently serving 38 years at the Roxbury Correctional Institution in Hagerstown, Maryland, while Erika is serving a life sentence plus 20 years at the Maryland Correctional Institution for Women in Jessup. Married in 1998, the Sifrits divorced in 2010.

Early lives 
Erika Elaine Grace was born in Roaring Spring, Pennsylvania, to Charlotte Gail (Klotz) and Gerald Mitchell Grace. Benjamin Adam Sifrit was born in Estherville, Iowa, to Elizabeth Ann (Graves) and Craig Arthur Sifrit. Erika and Benjamin married in 1998, when they were both 20 years old. She was an honors student and basketball star at Mary Washington College. Benjamin completed Basic Underwater Demolition/SEAL (BUD/S) training class 212 in 1997, but due to bad conduct discharge for repeatedly being absent without leave, insubordination, poor performance and wearing unauthorized insignia, had his Navy Enlisted Classification (NEC) 5326 Combatant Swimmer (SEAL) revoked.

Shortly after marrying, the Sifrits moved near Erika's hometown of Altoona, Pennsylvania. There, they opened and operated a scrapbook store.

Murders 
On May 25, 2002, the Sifrits, both 24 at the time, met another couple, Joshua Ford and Martha Crutchley, a vacationing couple from Fairfax, Virginia. After a night of partying together at the Seacrets nightclub in Ocean City, Maryland, the two couples went back to the Sifrits' condominium located in The Rainbow on 112th Street. According to records, the Sifrits claimed that Ford and Crutchley stole Erika's purse, and Benjamin pulled a gun on the couple. After retreating to the bathroom, Ford was fatally shot four times with Erika's gun. Crutchley was also killed; investigators believe that she was stabbed, but the official cause of death could not be determined from her remains. The bodies were then dismembered and disposed of in a grocery store dumpster in Rehoboth Beach, Delaware. The remains were transferred to a nearby landfill, where they were recovered by searchers nine days later.

Arrests and trials 
The Sifrits were arrested on May 31, 2002, when they were caught burglarizing a Hooters restaurant. When police searched Erika's purse, they uncovered the drivers' licenses of Ford and Crutchley, who at that point had been reported missing for days. Erika confessed to murdering the couple shortly after her apprehension, but claimed the idea was her husband's.

Because of the heavy publicity of the case, the Sifrits' trials were moved out of Worcester County, Maryland. Benjamin's trial was held in Rockville, and Erika's was held in Frederick. At Benjamin's 2003 trial, a 22-year-old woman named Melissa Seling testified that she was subjected to the same ritual that Joshua and Martha endured, although she was able to avoid being killed. On April 9, 2003, Benjamin was convicted of second-degree murder and first-degree assault in the death of Crutchley, and was acquitted of all charges in the death of Joshua Ford. He was later sentenced to thirty-eight years in prison. Erika's trial started shortly afterwards, on June 3, 2003. On June 11, she was convicted of first-degree murder in the death of Ford and second-degree murder in the death of Crutchley, and was later sentenced to life imprisonment plus twenty years.

Aftermath 
In March 2010, Benjamin Sifrit filed for divorce, which was granted in August 2010.

Both Sifrits have filed numerous appeals, all of which have failed. Benjamin exhausted his last appeal in 2010. Erika's appeal, citing ineffectiveness of counsel, was denied in 2014.

Benjamin Sifrit became eligible for parole in 2021. His first parole request was refused in April 2022. If he is not granted parole, he will be released from prison in 2030.  Erika Sifrit will be eligible for parole in 2024.

In popular culture 
The Sifrit case has been profiled on American Justice, Deadly Women, Forensic Files, Sins and Secrets, Snapped and True Crime Daily.

In July 2009, a book entitled Cruel Death, written by M. William Phelps, was released about the case.

References 

American people convicted of murder
Living people
Crimes in Maryland
Criminal duos
Criminals from Iowa
Criminals from Pennsylvania
Year of birth missing (living people)